Watson Escarpment is a major escarpment in the Queen Maud Mountains, trending northward along the east margin of Scott Glacier, then eastward to Reedy Glacier where it turns southward along the glacier's west side. Somewhat arcuate, the escarpment is nearly 100 nautical miles (180 km) long, rises 3,550 m above sea level, and 1,000 to 1,500 m above the adjacent terrain.

The north-central part of the escarpment was observed from a vantage point on Supporting Party Mountain and was partially mapped in December 1929 by the Byrd Antarctic Expedition geological party under Laurence Gould. The escarpment was more closely observed in December 1934 by the Byrd Antarctic Expedition geological party under Quin Blackburn, and was named by Byrd for Thomas J. Watson, American business executive, a patron of this expedition. The escarpment and its related features was mapped in detail by United States Geological Survey (USGS) from surveys and U.S. Navy air photos, 1960–64. 

The east extremity of the escarpment is defined by Shapley Ridge, a prominent ridge overlooking Reedy Glacier and it extending east from Cleveland Mesa. It was named by the Advisory Committee on Antarctic Names (US-ACAN) for Alan H. Shapley, Vice-Chairman of the U.S. National Committee for the IGY.

See also
 Acarospora Peak
 Burlock Peak
 Cole Peak
 Roaring Ridge
 Skilift Col

References 

Escarpments of Antarctica
Landforms of Marie Byrd Land